Simon Hebditch (born 5 August 1994) is a former professional ice hockey player and current international footballer who currently plays for Saint Pierraise of the Ligue SPM. He is a former player of the Saint Pierre and Miquelon national team.

Football career

Club career
Hebditch was part of the A.S. Saint Pierraise squad that competed in the 2018–19 Coupe de France. This match marked the first time that a Saint Pierre and Miquelon club faced opposition from mainland France in the Coupe de France as it was the first year that a club from the territory was allowed to participate in the tournament. Hebditch was in net for the club's 1–2 Third Round defeat to ALC Longvic in Longvic. His performance in the match was described by local media as "imperial".

International career
Hebditch played in three of Saint Pierre and Miquelon's matches at the 2012 Coupe de l'Outre-Mer. He came on as a substitute in the team's opening match against Guadeloupe before starting and playing the entire match against Réunion and French Guiana.

International career statistics

Ice hockey career

Hebditch played for the Saint Pierre team as a youth. For the 2012–13 season he played for Drakkars de Caen in the Ligue Magnus, the top division of hockey in France. He played in one game for the team that season. He also made one appearance in for the team in the 2012 Coupe de France. He was also part of the team's "B" squad. In 2014 he was part of team that won the bronze medal in the U22 league that season.

References

External links
Elite Prospects profile
National Football Teams profile

1994 births
Living people
French footballers
Saint Pierre and Miquelon footballers
Saint Pierre and Miquelon international footballers
Association football goalkeepers
French ice hockey defencemen
Drakkars de Caen players
People from Saint Pierre and Miquelon